is an anime series based on the Zoids model kits produced by Takara Tomy. The 5th Zoids anime, the anime is part of a cross-media relaunch of the franchise encompassing a new toy line, manga series, and video game for the Nintendo Switch, predominantly aimed at boys aged 10–12. Streamed from 7 July 2018 to 29 June 2019, this was the final series produced by Allspark Animation before being absorbed into Entertainment One on 9 October 2020.

Characters

Main characters

 Arashi is a villager who joins Team Freedom after acquiring the legendary Zoid Liger through chance. He eventually wins the Zoid's trust and is trained by Quade to master Wild Blast, with Liger able to master his trademark action "King Claw" (King of the Claw in Japanese), and later its variant "Ultra King Claw" (King of Claw Spiral in Japanese). However, Quade's death at Gigaboss's hands causes Arashi to enter a raging Berserk mode that increases Liger's power at the cost of attacking both friends and foes alike. After the fall of the Dark Metal Empire, Arashi and Liger part ways with their team to travel.

 

 Team Supreme's founding leader and a famous, powerful Zoid Seeker whose Zoid partner is Zaber Fang. Quade initially sought out Liger alongside the mysterious "Ancient Treasure Z" before meeting Arashi. He mentors the youth before resuming his search for "Ancient Treasure Z". Despite not being a member of the resistance, Quade openly opposes his former friend Gigaboss, as he stole half of Demise's hacker key before giving it to Arashi prior to his death by the emperor's hand. Quade appears as a spirit before his allies, enabling Zaber Fang to fight alongside them. Quade had also met Arashi's father, Apex, and Mitsuba before the events of the series took place.

 Battalia is an orphan whose parents were killed by bandits when she was a child. She becomes a bounty hunter to provide funding for the orphanage she lived in with her Scorpear-type Zoid partner, Needle. She ends up under the employ of the Dark Metal Empire's Numb-lock after impressing him with her skills. He tasks her with taking down 100 bounties for the Empire in exchange for a fortune that would allow her to support her orphanage. However, after meeting Arashi and becoming the first member of Team Freedom prior to learning Arashi is her final bounty, she eventually sides with her friends.

 

 Tanks' pilot is a member of Team Freedom who has a strong passion for Zoids, which is common for many characters in the show who introduce their Zoids with great enthusiasm. When a new Zoid appears, Analog explains its name, type and abilities. This can happen even when Analog is nowhere near the Zoid in question. Analog was initially a slave of the Dark Metal Empire. He was forced to perform Hacker Key experiments. For his own survival, he performed many of those experiments on Tanks, which filled him with guilt for a long time. After meeting Arashi, Analog summons the courage to revolt against his captors, which moves Tanks to give him its Zoid Key.

 

 A Team Freedom member and pilot of the Triceratops-like Zoid, Tryke. Bastion is a powerful pilot who uses his affinity for rap and dance to boost Tryke's fighting ability. His Zoid is relatively slow compared to the rest of the cast, but very effective at close range. Bastion started as a stingy pilot motivated only by money, which put him at odds with Arashi. It's later revealed that his desire for money is to buy expensive medicine from the Dark Metal Empire for his ailing sister. When he tries to steal medicine from Haxile of Dark Warriors, Bastion learns that he was being conned by the Empire. This makes him change his stingy ways, which earns him Tryke's Zoid Key and a place on Team Freedom.

A Team Freedom member and pilot of the -type Zoid, Alpha Shadow, who raised him after his father accidentally abandoned him while protecting him from a wild Zoid. He became determined to prove he was the best Zoid pilot in the world. Apex initially believed that friends were unnecessary, but his rivalry with Arashi slowly changed his views. Apex is a powerful pilot, and is the only one in the series to use the "Second Gear" ability of Wild Blast. He is assumed dead following his fight with Numb-Lock, with his teammates unaware that he resumed traveling alone. The English dub edits him into scenes of the final episode.

 

 A Team Freedom member and pilot of the spider-like Zoid, Phobia, Snare is a mysterious treasure hunter with a keen eye who steals from those aligned with the Dark Metal Empire.

 One of the Four Dark Warriors of the Dark Metal Empire and pilot of the Gilraptor-type Zoid, Ruin. Drake was the child of two archeologists who taught him to love and respect Zoids. Seeking funding for their work, the couple took Drake, Ruin, and another Gilraptor with them to the Dark Metal Empire. After his parents sacrificed themselves in failed attempt for him and their Zoids to escape, Drake was forced to become an obedient servant after being compelled to choose Ruin, while white Gilraptor was killed and fed to Demise. After numerous failed attempts to capture Arashi, Drake acquires a Zoid Key after acknowledging his bond with Ruin, leaving the Empire to aid Team Freedom in the final battle.

Supporting characters
Dyna / 

 Member of the Supreme Team and pilot of Winghorn.

Shades / 

 Member of the Supreme Team and pilot of Flyhorn.

Scrapes / 

 Member of the Supreme Team and pilot of Ankylosaurus Zoid, Knockz.

Pach / 

 Member of the Supreme Team and pilot of the Pachycephhlosaurus Zoid, Rash.

 Arashi's father.

Gaffer / 

 Arashi's grandfather.

Greta / 

 Greta is a transporter and does not participate in battle. However, she has an extremely strong bond with her Silkworm Zoid, Spineless.

Master Bug / 

 Master Bug is a strange man who makes up stories in his spare time. Due to his lack of contact with the outside world, he is largely oblivious to current events happening around him and has an intense desire for reading books to fill the time. Master Bug is a master Zoid pilot. His skills are second to none. He is easily able to take on many Zoids at once, even fighting the three members of Team Freedom simultaneously, without any effort.

Dark Metal Empire
Marcellus / 

 The eccentric but ruthless leader of the Dark Metal Empire, he is cruel to his subordinates and seeks stronger Zoids to pilot. He was originally a friend of Quade, as they both trained under Master Bug, until learning of the legendary Zoid , also known as "Ancient Treasure Z", who devours other Zoids to become stronger. Gigaboss establishes the Dark Metal Empire to revive Demise, before losing half of the original Hacker Key to Quade. He commissions the creation of Hacker Key copies so that he can tame Demise. While succeeding in acquiring the key, Gigaboss ends up orchestrating his death when Demise is knocked back into the volcano he was excavated from.

 

 A member of Dark Metal Empire's Four Dark Warriors and a mad scientist who uses deception in battle while upgrading his Alligator Zoid, Overbyte, replacing the Zoid with the mind-controlled Knockz.

 

 A drum-playing member of the Dark Metal Empire's Four Dark Warriors and pilot of the gorilla Zoid, Dragz.

 

 A member of the Dark Metal Empire's Four Dark Warriors and a master tactician. He originally pilots the stegosaurus-like Zoid, Bonesaw, before replacing it with the dimetrodon-like Zoid, Dimomite, upgraded with Demise's cells, giving him the ability to brainwash other Zoids and convert them to the Dark Metal Empire's cause.

Zoids Wild Zero

Voiced by: Shō Nogami

Voiced by: Hazuki Senda

Voiced by: Makoto Yasumura

Voiced by: Yōko Hikasa

Voiced by: Toshiki Masuda

Voiced by: Daisuke Kishio

	
Voiced by: Satoshi Mikami

Voiced by: Yoshito Yasuhara

Electora Gate

Media

Manga
A manga series by Moricha began monthly serialization in Shogakukan's CoroCoro Comic magazine from April 2018 to May 2019.

A sequel series, also by Moricha, began serialization from September 2019 to October 2020.

Anime
Wild aired on Mainichi Broadcasting System and Tokyo Broadcasting System from July 7, 2018, to June 29, 2019 in addition to other networks. Inspired by Moricha's manga, the series is produced by OLM, directed by Norihiko Sudō and written by Mitsutaka Hirota. On June 22, 2019, it was announced that Zoids Wild would end on June 29, 2019.

On October 1, 2018, it was reported that Hasbro currently has plans to bring Zoids Wild to North America with Hasbro Studios (now Allspark) licensing the anime for an English dub, which was tentatively titled Zoids: Build Them to Life. before being retitled to just Zoids and then back to its original title. The dub is produced by Ocean Productions. 

The first half of the dub released on Netflix on August 14, 2020 and then second half on October 3, the latter originally slated to be released two days earlier. The dub was removed from Netflix on August 15, 2022. A Hong Kong-produced English dub began airing on Cartoon Network in the Philippines on March 2, 2019. It also aired in Singapore on Okto on April 8, before moving to Channel 5 the following month due to Okto's closure.

A second season, titled Zoids Wild Zero has been announced, featuring a brand-new story with new characters, directed by Takao Kato and written by Kenichi Araki. The second season aired from October 4, 2019 to October 16, 2020, on TV Tokyo. On May 22, 2020, it was announced further episodes would delayed due to the COVID-19 pandemic. On June 11, 2020, it was announced the anime would return on June 19, 2020.

In September 2020, it was announced Zoids Wild Senki, a CG-animated miniseries released on YouTube, on the CoroCoro's, Takara Tomy's YouTube channels, starting from October 17, 2020.

Video games
An arcade game called  was released by Takara Tomy in Japan on January 24, 2019. It was followed by the Nintendo Switch title,  action game developed by Eighting on February 28, 2019. Outright Games released the title in Australia, Europe and North America as Zoids Wild: Blast Unleashed on October 16, 2020. A third installment of the video game series is Zoids Wild: Infinity Blast. It released on November 26, 2020 in Japan.

References

External links
 Official website (Japanese) (Zoids Wild)
 Official website (Japanese) (Zoids Wild: Zero)
 

2018 anime television series debuts
2019 anime television series debuts
2020 anime television series debuts
Japanese children's animated action television series
Japanese children's animated adventure television series
Japanese children's animated science fiction television series
Adventure anime and manga
Mecha anime and manga
Mainichi Broadcasting System original programming
OLM, Inc.
Nintendo Switch games
Nintendo Switch-only games
Shogakukan manga
Shōnen manga
Bandai Namco franchises
Television shows based on Takara Tomy toys
Zoids
TV Tokyo original programming
Anime postponed due to the COVID-19 pandemic
Anime productions suspended due to the COVID-19 pandemic